Donough MacCarthy, 4th Earl of Clancarty (1668–1734) fought for James II in the Williamite War in Ireland at the Siege of Derry. He was attainted in 1691 after the defeat. MacCarthy went into exile to the Netherlands, where he lived for some time on the tiny island of Rottumeroog, and in Germany near Hamburg where he died.

Birth and origins 
Donough was born in 1668 at Blarney, Ireland. He was the only son of Callaghan MacCarty and his wife Elizabeth Fitzgerald. His father was the 3rd Earl of Clancarty. His father's family, the MacCarthys of Muskerry descended from the kings of Desmond. Donough's mother was from the FitzGerald dynasty, an Old English family. She was a daughter of George FitzGerald, 16th Earl of Kildare, and Lady Joan Boyle. Both parents were Protestant, but his father had originally been Catholic. His parents had married before 1641. He was an only son but had three sisters, who are listed in his father's article.

4th Earl 
MacCarty, aged eight, succeeded his father in 1676 as the 4th Earl of Clancarty and inherited his father's massive Irish estates in County Cork and County Kerry. Clancarty's upbringing became a matter of high policy. His mother, one of the few protestants in the family, brought him to England and placed him under the tutelage of John Fell, Bishop of Oxford, for a Protestant education. She then remarried to Sir William Davys, the Lord Chief Justice of Ireland.

Marriage 
However, neither his mother nor the bishop could match the influence of his uncle Justin McCarthy, Viscount Mountcashel, who was one of the closest advisers of the Duke of York, the future James II. They convinced King Charles II to provide a royal letter, countersigned by Robert Spencer, 2nd Earl of Sunderland, then the principal Secretary of State in England, inviting Clancarty to the Palace of Whitehall for the 1684 Christmas celebrations where, with Justin's connivance, Clancarty was married to Sunderland's daughter Elizabeth Spencer (1671–1704). However,  reports that they had married earlier on 30 October 1684.

They were sixteen and thirteen years old respectively. The couple soon separated and the marriage was not consummated until many years later. At that time Clancarty, his bride and his father-in-law all were Protestants. In February 1685 James II, the Catholic, succeeded to the throne. Clancarty and his father-in-law became Catholics in the summer of 1686.

Williamite War in Ireland 
When James II landed in Kinsale on 12 March 1689, Clancarty received him in the house he owned there. James made him a Lord of the Bed Chamber.

Clancarty then raised a regiment of foot for James II. During the Siege of Derry he marched his regiment up from Munster to Derry where he arrived on 28 June 1689. He then led a daring night attack against the Butchers Gate immediately on the evening of his arrival. The besieged were surprised and the attackers were able to come up against the gate and touch it but were eventually thrown back.

He was taken prisoner at the Siege of Cork in 1690 and held in the Tower of London. He was outlawed and attainted in Ireland by the Williamites on 11 May 1691, forfeiting his titles and losing his estates.

With his wife in exile 
Having been detained for three years, he escaped from the Tower of London in 1694 and fled to James II's court at the Château de Saint-Germain-en-Laye.

He returned to England in the new year 1698 and sought out his wife Elizabeth to finally begin their married life, only to be turned in to the authorities by his brother-in-law, Lord Spencer, who had been alerted by the family servants. The case raised a public furore and William III, who did not take the matter seriously, said that he had never been bothered so much over anything so trivial as the affair of "that little spark Clancarty". Months later, MacCarthy was permitted to flee to exile on the continent, accompanied by his wife. Most of his estates were appropriated by the king's main adviser, the Dutchman Hans Willem Bentinck, 1st Earl of Portland.

The couple settled down in Hamburg-Altona and Lübeck. In 1702 they were living in the 'Irish house' close to the Altona sawmill. The following year MacCarthy bought a small tavern near the fishing village of Blankenese on the northern shore of the Elbe estuary, and in 1706 he bought the island and seigneurie of Rottumeroog, in the Netherlands, where he lived with his libertine household until it was washed away by the Christmas flood of 1717. From then on, he spent the winters elsewhere, but returned to the island each summer until he sold it in 1731. In 1723 he acquired a tiny country house in Oudwoude in Friesland. The assertion that he bought the house from Archibald Campbell, 10th Earl of Argyll is not supported by contemporary documents. In 1729 the anti-Orangist statesman Evert Joost Lewe allowed him to live at Elmersma, a manor house in the village of Hoogkerk near Groningen, without paying rent.

 
Donough and Elizabeth had three children, two sons:
Robert (1698–1769), became a captain in the Royal Navy and commanded HMS Adventure
Justin, became an officer in the Neapolitan Army

—and a daughter:
Charlotte, married John West, 1st Earl De La Warr

MacCarthy was a typical adventurer, crossing the Wadden Sea on his yacht and making a living by plundering shipwrecks and gathering washed-up merchandise. The authorities disapproved of his methods and suspected him of supporting the Jacobite cause. He was commonly known to the Dutch as "de malle graaf" (the crazy earl). In 1721 he visited London and was restored to his former titles, but without getting back his estates.

A carefully orchestrated story of his successful enterprises was published in 1732. It prompted the myth told to his former countrymen that he owned a large manor near Hamburg.

Death and timeline 
He died on 1 October 1734 at the Prahlenhof near Hamburg-St. Pauli, leaving severe debts leading to a bankruptcy sale.

Notes and references

Notes

Citations

Sources 

 
 
 
  – Canonteign to Cutts (for Clancarty)
 
  – (for timeline)
 
 
 
  – Blood royal, dukes, earls (for Earl of Kildare)
  – 1695 to 1702
 
  – Irish stem
 
 
 

1668 births
1734 deaths
17th-century Irish people
18th-century Irish people
Earls of Clancarty
Irish Jacobites
MacCarthy dynasty
Members of the Irish House of Lords
People from County Cork
MacCarthy
Wild Geese (soldiers)